Safarlu (also Romanized as Şafarlū) is a village in Keyvan Rural District, in the Central District of Khoda Afarin County, East Azerbaijan Province, Iran. At the 2006 census, its population was 298, in 72 families.

In the wake of White Revolution (early 1960s) a clan of Mohammad Khanlu tribe, comprising 55 households,  used Safarlu as their winter quarters.

References 

Populated places in Khoda Afarin County
Kurdish settlements in East Azerbaijan Province